The Irish Federation of University Teachers (IFUT) is a trade union representing university staff in Ireland.

The union originated among a group of teachers at Maynooth College, who met informally from 1962 to 1964.  In 1965, they formed the IFUT, and held its first general meeting in 1966.  Among the founder members was Kader Asmal, who also founded and led the Irish Anti-Apartheid Movement.

By the time the union registered, in 1970, it had fifty members at universities in Ireland.  It grew rapidly, and by 2005 had around 1,700 members.  The union is affiliated to the Irish Congress of Trade Unions and Education International.

Leadership

General Secretaries
1975: Kieran Mulvey
1980: Daltún Ó Ceallaigh
2007: Mike Jennings
2017: Joan Donegan

Originally the general secretary was termed the executive secretary.

Chairmen and Presidents
1965: J. J. Morrissey (UCD)
1968: Thomas Desmond Williams (UCD)
1969: George Dawson (TCD)
1970: Sean Lavelle (UCG)
1971: Robin Dudley Edwards (UCD)
1972: Enda McDonagh (Maynooth)
1974: Kader Asmal (TCD)
1975: Seosamh Hanly (UCD)
1977: Patrick J. O'Flynn (UCD)
1979: John L'Estrange
1980: Fergus Lalor (UCC)
1981: Bernard McCartan (TCD)
1983: Keith Warnock (UCG)
1985: John T. Lewis (DIAS)
1987: Garrett Barden (UCC)
1989: Caroline Hussey (UCD)
1992: Anne Clune (TCD)
1994: Eugene Wall (MICL)
1997: Maureen Killeavy (UCD)
2001: Pat Burke (SPD)
2003: Brendán Ó Cochláin] (NUIG)
2006: Joe Brady (UCD)
2010: Hugh Gibbons (TCD)
2011: Marie Clarke (UCD)
2013: Rose Malone (Maynooth)
2015: Michael Delargey (UCC)
2017: Aidan Seery (TCD)
2019: Angela Flynn (UCC)
2021: Anthony Harvey (RIA)

The role was termed chairman from 1965-1972 and president from 1972 to present.

References

Further reading
 Marie Coleman, IFUT - A History: The Irish Federation of University Teachers 1963-99

Trade unions in Ireland
1965 establishments in Ireland
Tertiary education trade unions
Trade unions established in 1965
Trade unions in the Republic of Ireland
Seanad nominating bodies